Bhakt Singh may refer to:

 Bhakht Singh (Brother) (1903–2000), Evangelist and founder of Hebron Ministries.
 Bakht Singh (Maharaja) (1706–1752), ruler of present-day Rajasthan, India
 Guru Bhakt Singh 'Bhakt' (1893–1983), Indian poet and dramatist